Pijin (Solomons Pidgin or Neo-Solomonic) is a language spoken in Solomon Islands. It is closely related to Tok Pisin of Papua New Guinea and Bislama of Vanuatu; these might be considered dialects of a single language. It is also related to Torres Strait Creole of Torres Strait, though more distantly.

In 1999 there were 307,000 second- or third-language speakers with a literacy rate in first language of 60%, a literacy rate in second language of 50%.

History

1800–1860 
During the early nineteenth century, an English jargon, known as Beach-la-Mar, developed and spread through the Western Pacific as a language used among traders (lingua franca) associated with the whaling industry at the end of the 18th century, the sandalwood trade of the 1830s, and the bêche-de-mer trade of the 1850s.

1860–1880 
Between 1863 and 1906, blackbirding was used for the sugar cane plantation labour trade in Queensland, Samoa, Fiji and New Caledonia. At the beginning of the trade period, the Australian planters started to recruit in the Loyalty Islands early 1860s, Gilbert Islands and the Banks Islands around the mid-1860s, New Hebrides and the Santa Cruz Islands in the early 1870s, and New Ireland and New Britain from 1879 when recruiting became difficult. Around 13,000 Solomon Islanders were taken to Queensland during this labour trade period.

The (Kanaka) pidgin language was used on the plantations and became the lingua franca spoken between Melanesian workers (the Kanakas, as they were called) and European overseers. When Solomon Islanders came back to the Solomons at the end of their contract, or when they were forcefully repatriated at the end of the labour trade period (1904), they brought pidgin to the Solomon Islands. Old people today still remember the stories that were told by the old former Queensland hands many years after their return

1880–1900 
Plantation languages continued into the 20th century even though the process of blackbirding had ceased. Due to the changing nature of labour traffic there was a divergence of Samoan plantation Pijin and New Guinea Tok Pisin and also other plantation Pijin and Oceanic Pijins such as Bislama and Solomon Pijin.

After 1900 
In 1901, there were approximately 10,000 Pacific Islanders working in Australia, most in the sugar cane industry in Queensland and northern New South Wales, many working as indentured labourers. The Pacific Island Labourers Act 1901, Parliament of Australia was the facilitation instrument used to deport approximately 7,500 Pacific Islanders.

Up until 1911 approximately 30,000 Solomon Islanders were indentured labourers to Queensland, Fiji, Samoa and New Caledonia. The use of Pijin by churches and missionaries assisted in the spread of Pijin.

With Pax Britannica and the advent of the local plantation system in the Solomon Islands, the use of Pijin was reactivated and the language started to spread in the country.  It also acquired more Solomonic linguistic characteristics.  Throughout the 20th century Pijin kept spreading: historical events such as Maasina Rule and WWII, and social changes such as urbanisation, played a central role in the transformation of the language. It is now the lingua franca of the country, though it has no official status.

2000s 
Despite being the lingua franca of Solomon Islands, Pijin remains a spoken language with little to no effort made thus far on the part of the national government toward standardising its orthography and grammar. Efforts at standardisation have been made by Christian Associations such as SITAG. There exists a partial dictionary since 1978 (Simons and Young 1978), a full dictionary of Pijin since 2002 (Jourdan 2002), a spelling list (Beimers 2010) and a complete description of its grammar (Beimers 2009). This being the case, Pijin remains a very flexible language where the main focus is on message delivery irrespective of the niceties of formal sentence construction.  A translation of the Bible into Pijin also represents a standardisation of some aspects of Pijin.

Pronunciation 

(Recreated with IPA from Wateha'a, Jourdan, and Mugler.)

Variation in pronunciation 
Several consonant phonemes show variation, in part depending on the speaker's personal linguistic background – i.e. the phonological profile of the  vernacular language(s) they speak at home.

Several cases of variation are simply due to the regular devoicing of voiced consonants at the end of syllables (a common alternation in the world's languages)

Other cases reflect the widespread habit, among Oceanic languages, to associate voicing with prenasalization:

Introductions 
 = 'Good afternoon everyone!'

 = 'My name is Charles'

 = 'How are you'

 = 'What is your name?'

 = 'Where are you from?'

 = 'I'm pleased to meet you.'

 = 'What languages do you know?'

Replies 
 = 'I am all right'

 = 'I am good'

 = 'All right'

 = 'And how are you?'

 = 'Thank you very much'

Personal pronouns

Number 
Pijin, like other languages to which it is related, involves a distinction between singular, dual, trial and plural pronouns. Dual forms refer to two people or things, trial forms refer to three and plural forms refer to three or more. Such pronoun forms do not occur in English but are common in South Pacific languages.

Clusivity 
Pijin pronouns also use different forms to distinguish between inclusive and exclusive pronouns. The inclusive and exclusive features are only realised in the first person dual, trial, and plural pronoun forms. For example, the first-person dual inclusive pronoun, means 'we' (you and me, including the listener), and the first-person dual exclusive pronoun, means 'we' (him/her and me, excluding the listener). This dual inclusive pronoun is used quite frequently in the Solomon Islands. It is used most often in religious sermons when the speaker is referring to a relationship between himself/herself and a specific individual in the audience.

Questions 
  = 'Where is your place?' (i.e. 'What is your address?')
  = 'Where are you now?'
  (pointing to an object) = 'What is that one?'
  = 'How much will it cost me to send this letter to Japan?'
  = 'Who will/might be able to help us with this mess'
  = 'Where will/would I be able I buy a plane ticket?'
  = 'How many people can your truck/car/van carry?'
  –  = 'Do you have children? – No.'
The question can be between question marks since in yes–no questions, the intonation can be the only difference.
  = 'Solomon Islands is a great country, isn't it?'

General expressions 
  = 'Thanks a lot for your help'
   = 'No worries. It's alright.'
  = 'That's it!' or 'That's the one!'
  = 'Voila!' or 'Told you so!' (A lot of people smile when foreigners use this correctly)
  = 'You’re very beautiful!'
  = 'Wow!' []
  =  but used generally to express surprise or shock.
  = 'Liar/Cheat!'
  = 'Are you crazy?'
  = 'This (thing) is broken.'
  = 'I can't afford it.'
  = 'You understand Pijin very well'
  = 'You know a lot!'
  = 'I don't know' or 'I can't'
  = 'Bye!'
  = 'my brother / my sister' (used respectfully to address the person to whom one is speaking – if spoken by a foreigner it can be quite powerful for breaking the ice)
  = 'This is simply white-man nonsense.'
  = 'I'm injured, and going to the hospital'. ( 'Number Nine' was the name of the main hospital in Honiara)
  = 'He is already dead.'
  = 'How many people can your truck/car/van carry?'
  = 'Certainly not!' (The phrase may be between exclamation marks)

Transitive verb suffix 
In comparison to their original English forms Pijin transitive verbs have an additional morpheme in the form of a suffix. To the English speaker, these morphemes sound like VERB + 'him' or 'them.' For example, the Pijin word for 'love' would be .

Examples:

Epenthesis 
Another linguistic phenomena that occurred in the transitions from English to Solomon Islands' Pijin is the addition of vowels in the interior and final positions of a word. Like in most languages in the Solomon Islands, consonant clusters and consonant-final words do not occur in Pijin. Therefore, speakers of the language add vowels in between consonants and word-finally to adapt the English forms to Pijin grammar. The selection of the extra vowels is usually made in accordance with vowel harmony rules. For example, the word 'business' becomes *  or *  (depending on the age and dialect of the Pijin speaker).

See also 
 Pidgin
 Creole language

Notes

References

External links 

 Holy Communion in Solomon Islands Pijin (1999) translated by Ernest W. Lee, transcribed by Richard Mammana
 Paradisec has a number of collections that include Pijin language materials
 Good News – Pijin (Religious readings) – audio examples

English-based pidgins and creoles
Languages of the Solomon Islands